The  is an AC electric multiple unit train type operated on limited express services by Kyushu Railway Company (JR Kyushu) in Japan since March 1988.

Design
The trains were built jointly by Hitachi, Kinki Sharyo, and JR Kyushu (at its Kokura factory).

Formations

5-car Kamome sets (CM1–5)
The 5-car sets used on Kamome services are formed as follows.

Cars 2 and 5 are each fitted with one scissors-type pantograph.

4-car Midori sets (CM11–15)

The 4-car sets used on Midori services are formed as follows.

Car 14 is fitted with one scissors-type pantograph.

4-car Huis Ten Bosch sets (CM21–25)

The 4-car sets used on Huis Ten Bosch services are formed as follows.

Car 9 is fitted with one scissors-type pantograph.

5-car Nichirin sets (CM31–35)
The 5-car sets used on Nichirin services are formed as follows.

Cars 2 and 5 are each fitted with one scissors-type pantograph.

Set CM35 normally operates as a 4-car set.

Past formations
The following formations were used from introduction in 1988 until the fleet was refurbished and reformed in 2000.

9-car sets

 9-car sets used on Hyper Kamome services from March 1990 until June 1994

Cars 2, 4, 6, and 9 were each fitted with one scissors-type pantograph.

8-car sets
 8-car sets used on Hyper Kamome services from March 1990 until June 1994

Cars 3, 5, and 8 were each fitted with one scissors-type pantograph.

7-car sets
 7-car sets used on Ariake and Hyper Ariake services during busy seasons from 1 April 1988

Cars 2, 4, and 7 were each fitted with one scissors-type pantograph.
 7-car sets used on Hyper Kamome services from 18 March 1993

Cars 2, 4, and 7 were each fitted with one scissors-type pantograph.

6-car sets
 6-car sets used on Hyper Nichirin services from 18 March 1993

Cars 3 and 6 were each fitted with one scissors-type pantograph.

5-car sets

 5-car sets used on Ariake and Super Ariake services from 1 April 1988

Cars 2, and 5 were each fitted with one scissors-type pantograph.
 5-car sets used on Hyper Ariake services from March 1990 until July 1992 and on Tsubame services from 15 July 1992

Cars 2, and 5 were each fitted with one scissors-type pantograph.

4-car sets
 4-car sets used on Hyper Ariake services from March 1990 until July 1992 and on Ariake and Hyper Nichirin services from 15 July 1992

Car 5 was fitted with one scissors-type pantograph.

3-car sets
3-car sets used on Ariake and Super Ariake services from 1 April 1988 until 1990

Car 3 was fitted with one scissors-type pantograph.

History
The 783 series trains were first introduced from 13 March 1988, initially branded as "Hyper Saloon".

On 30 May 1989, the 783 series design was awarded the 1988 Laurel Prize by the Japan Railfan Club. A special award ceremony was held at platform 1 of Hakata Station on 26 August 1989.

All cars were made no-smoking from the start of the revised timetable on 18 March 2007.

References

External links

Electric multiple units of Japan
Kyushu Railway Company
Train-related introductions in 1988
Hitachi multiple units
20 kV AC multiple units
Kinki Sharyo multiple units